This is a list of productions based on The Muppets characters and franchise, including films, television series and specials, and other media. The franchise's main work is The Muppet Show, a syndicated television series which ran from 1976 to 1981. The franchise includes eight feature films, and other television series.

Films

Direct-to-video releases

Television

Series

Television films

Television specials

Other appearances

 The Mike Douglas Show
 Today
 Good Morning America
 The Ed Sullivan Show
 Saturday Night Live
 60 Minutes
 The Tonight Show
 Jimmy Kimmel Live!
 Extreme Makeover: Home Edition
 Dancing with the Stars
 The Daily Show
 America's Funniest Home Videos
 Larry King Live
 Late Night with Jimmy Fallon
 The Colbert Report
 30 Rock
 WWE Raw
 WWE Tribute to the Troops
 The Voice
  Holey Moley
  The Masked Singer (US)
 MasterChef Junior The One Show The Ellen DeGeneres Show The X Factor Comic Relief So Random! Good Luck Charlie Take Two with Phineas and Ferb Ant and Dec's Saturday Night Takeaway The View America's Got Talent Disney Parks Christmas Day Parade The Wonderful World of Disney: Disneyland 60 The Late Late Show with James Corden Carpool Karaoke: The Series Monday Night FootballWeb series

Video games
A number of video games featuring the Muppets have been produced since the 1990s.
 Muppet Adventure: Chaos at the Carnival (1990)
 Muppets Inside (1996)
 Muppet RaceMania (2000)
 Muppet Monster Adventure (2000)
 Spy Muppets: License to Croak (2003)
 Muppets Party Cruise (2003)
 The Muppets Movie Adventures'' (2014)

Notes

  Distribution rights were purchased by The Jim Henson Company from ITC Entertainment in August 1984. The rights were then acquired by Walt Disney Studios upon their parent company's acquisition of the Muppets franchise in 2004. The films have since been reissued under the Walt Disney Pictures banner.

See also
 The Muppets discography
 List of Sesame Workshop productions

References

External links

The Muppets
Disney-related lists
Lists of films by source
Lists of American television series
American musical comedy television series